Ghel is a village and union council of Murree Tehsil in the Murree District of Punjab, Pakistan.

It is north-east of the tehsil. According to the 1998 census of Pakistan it had a population of 9,488.

References

Villages Of Ghel. Kohatti Bochal Kakrahi Bhadhar Bhnatti Mawla Degal Las Kohthar Seri Chinota Bilgran Chanala. Edited By Majid Ali Abbasi From Kakrahi.

Populated places in Murree District